Chilelopsis is a genus of spider in the family Nemesiidae.

Species
, the World Spider Catalog accepted the following species:

Chilelopsis calderoni Goloboff, 1995 (type species) – Chile
Chilelopsis puertoviejo Goloboff, 1995 – Chile
Chilelopsis serena Goloboff, 1995 – Chile

References

Nemesiidae
Mygalomorphae genera
Spiders of South America
Endemic fauna of Chile